Ann Forrest (known also by her birth name Anna Kromann  and as Ann Kroman or Ann Kornan; 14 April 1895 – 25 October 1985) was a Danish-born American actress of Hollywood's silent films.

Biography
Forrest was born 14 April 1895 in Sønderho, Denmark and died 25 October 1985 in San Diego, California. Between 1915 and 1925, she appeared in 33 movies. According to Ruth Wing, author of the Blue Book of the Screen, Forrest enjoyed playing homely character roles, and her characters often wept during the film. However, wanting to capitalize on her beauty, producers later cast her in society dramas.

Wing wrote "Ann Forrest is 'different'. She is different from most screen stars in personality and beauty. But the greatest difference lies in her achievement of cinema fame. Ann wept her way to stardom."

Filmography

References

External links 

Ann Forrest at Fandango
Houdini's leading ladies: Ann Forrest at Wild About Harry

1895 births
1985 deaths
Danish film actresses
Danish silent film actresses
Danish emigrants to the United States
People from Fanø Municipality
20th-century Danish actresses